Vedderheia is a village in Kristiansand municipality in Agder county, Norway. The area is entirely a residential community with most people working in the nearby villages of Lunde, Høllen, and Tangvall. Since 2003, Vedderheia has been considered a part of the greater Søgne urban area, so separate population statistics are no longer calculated.

References

Villages in Agder
Geography of Kristiansand